Gade Hanuma Vihari (born 13 October 1993) is an Indian international cricketer who has played for Indian cricket team. He currently plays for Andhra and captains them in Ranji Trophy. Vihari was a member of India that won test series in Australia in 2018-19 and 2020-21 season.

Domestic career
Vihari played for Sunrisers Hyderabad in the sixth edition of the Indian Premier League in 2013. In one of the league matches against Royal Challengers Bangalore in Hyderabad, Vihari opened the bowling as an off-spinner and removed Chris Gayle for just 1. He also scored an unbeaten 46 in the same match while chasing. Sunrisers went on to win this match through a super-over.

Vihari was responsible for one-third of Hyderabad's total in the innings against Andhra in 2013/14 Ranji Trophy opener at Rajiv Gandhi International Stadium. He scored 75 in the first innings before being dismissed by CV Stephen, and then scored unbeaten 68 runs.

In October 2017, Vihari scored his first triple century, making 302 not out for Andhra against Odisha in the 2017–18 Ranji Trophy. He was the leading run-scorer for Andhra in the 2017–18 Ranji Trophy, with 752 runs in six matches.

In October 2018, Vihari was named in India B's squad for the 2018–19 Deodhar Trophy. In December 2018, he was bought by the Delhi Capitals in the player auction for the 2019 Indian Premier League. In October 2019, he was named as the captain of India A for the 2019–20 Deodhar Trophy. He was released by the Delhi Capitals ahead of the 2020 IPL auction.

In April 2021, Vihari was signed by Warwickshire County Cricket Club for their 2021 season of the County Championship.

International career
In August 2018, Vihari was called up to India's Test squad for the final two Tests against England. He made his Test debut against England on 7 September 2018, in the 5th Test match of India tour of England 2018, and scored his maiden half-century (56 off 124 balls) in the first innings. In that match, he also became the final bowler in test cricket to dismiss England's highest ever test run scorer Alastair Cook . In December 2018, he was called for 2018-19 Border-Gavaskar trophy and opened the innings in 3rd Test match for India with debutant Mayank Agarwal. He had a decent tour as India won the series 2–1.

On 25 August 2019, against the West Indies, Vihari made 93 runs off 128 balls in the 2nd innings of the 1st Test match, which was labelled as a crucial knock for India as they gave the Windies a target of 419 runs with only 1 day remaining of the Test match. In the second Test match against the West Indies, Vihari scored his maiden Test century. In October 2019, he was selected for India's 3 match Test series against South Africa in India and played only in the 1st Test and this was his 1st ever international match in India. In February 2020, he was called for India's 2 Match Test series against New Zealand in New Zealand and scored a half century in the 1st innings of the 2nd Test.
He outplayed the fiery Australian attack in the 2020-2021 Border-Gavaskar Trophy in the third Test at Sydney with an unbeaten 23 playing 161 balls and ensured India to a draw. While batting in the 4th innings and last day of the match, he suffered a hamstring injury  just before the tea. But, he continued to play and along with Ravichandran Ashwin, saved the match for India.

References

External links 

1993 births
Living people
Indian cricketers
India Test cricketers
Hyderabad cricketers
South Zone cricketers
Sunrisers Hyderabad cricketers
People from Kakinada
Cricketers from Andhra Pradesh
India Blue cricketers
Indian A cricketers